Tun Min (also known as Maung Myanmar Tun Min) is a Myanmar's two-time gold medal winning professional bodybuilder. He won first prize in the 65-kilo men's freehand competition and silver medals in Asian Bodybuilding and Fitness Championships in 2017.

Early life
Tun was born on 1970 in Yaw, Magwe Region, Myanmar.

Competitive placings

2018  11th World Body Building and Physique Sports Champions (winner)
2018 Asian Body Building And Physique Sports Championship 2018  (Silver Medal) 
  2017 The 51st Asian Bodybuilding and Physique Sports Championships (Gold Medal — Men Bodybuilding 65 kg) 
2012	WBPF World Championships (4th Runner Up— Men Bodybuilding 60 kg)
SEA Championships (1st Runner Up— Men Bodybuilding 60 kg)
2011	WBPF World Men's Bodybuilding Championships (3rd Runner Up— Men Bodybuilding 60 kg)
Asian and World Bodybuilding & Physique Sports Championships (2nd Runner Up— Asian Men Bodybuilding 60 kg)

References

Burmese bodybuilders
Living people
Professional bodybuilders
People from Magway Division
1970 births
Burmese male bodybuilders